JDS Kumano (DE-224) was the tenth ship of the s of Japan Maritime Self-Defense Force.

Development and design 
The main anti-submarine (ASW) weapon was changed from the M/50  ASW rocket launcher to the ASROC anti-submarine missile. The octuple launcher for ASROC was stationed at the mid-deck, and the entire ship design was prescribed by this stationing.

Construction and career
Kumano was laid down on 29 May 1974 at Hitachi Zosen Corporation, Osaka and launched on 24 February 1975. The vessel commissioned on 19 November 1975. On 11 May 1976, the 7th Escort Corps was renamed the 36th Escort Corps of the Kure District Force.

On 19 March 1986, Kumano was transferred to Maizuru District Force 31st Escort Corps, and the fixed port was transferred to Maizuru. On 12 December 1989, she was transferred to the 33rd Escort Corps of the Yokosuka District Force, and the fixed port was transferred to Yokosuka.

The destroyer escort performed as host ship for the Chilean sailing training ship  which arrived in Tokyo on June 26, 1993. On 12 April 1994, Kumano made exchanges with the French Navy   which had made a goodwill visit to Yokosuka base. On 1 August 1995, she was transferred to the 36th Kure District Force Escort Corps and transferred to Kure again. Kumano joined the 22nd Escort Corps of the Kure District Force on 24 March 1997.

Kumano was decommissioned on 18 May 2001.

References

1975 ships
Ships built by Hitachi Zosen Corporation
Chikugo-class destroyer escorts